was a Japanese film and television actress. She was called the Japanese Grace Kelly when she debuted. She was scouted and joined Toho film company. In the same year, she made her film debut with Narazumono. Her notable films are Rodan (1956), The H-Man (1958), and Yasujirō Ozu’s film The End of Summer (1961).  She was married to actor Hideaki Nitani until his death in 2012.

She died of heart failure on June 14, 2016, at the age of 79.

Filmography

Film
 Rodan (1956)
 Be Happy, These Two Lovers (1957)
 The Mysterians (1957)
 The H-Man (1958)
  aka The Princess of Badger Palace (1958)
 A Holiday in Tokyo (1958)
 Man Against Man aka Otoko tai otoko (1960)
 The Secret of the Telegian (1960)
 Challenge to Live (1961)
 The Last War (1961)
 The End of Summer (1961)
 Different Sons (1961)
 Chûshingura aka 47 Samurai (1962)
 Gorath (1962)
 Wall-Eyed Nippon (1963)
 Yearning (1964)
 Kiganjo no Boken (aka The Adventure of Kigan Castle) (1966)

 Niini no Koto o Wasurenaide (2009)

TV series
 Hanekonma (1986)
 Great Teacher Onizuka (1998)
 Forbidden Love (1999)
 Ohisama (2011)
 I am Mita, Your Housekeeper (2011)
 Doctor-X: Surgeon Michiko Daimon (2013)

References

External links
Yumi Shirakawa Filmography

1936 births
2016 deaths
Japanese film actresses
20th-century Japanese actresses
21st-century Japanese actresses
Actresses from Tokyo